

Cuchi is a town and municipality in Cuando Cubango Province in Angola. The population of the municipality was 42,974 in 2014.

Transport
It is served by a station on the southern main line of South Angolan Railways.

Climate

Average annual temperatures range from −2 to 18 °C.

See also
 Railway stations in Angola

References

Populated places in Cuando Cubango Province
Municipalities of Angola